Leslie Arthur Williams  (14 May 1909 – 2 July 1996)  was Archdeacon of Bristol from 1967  to 1979.

Williams was educated at Downing College, Cambridge and ordained in 1935. He was Vicar of Corsham from 1947 to 1953; of Bishopston from 1953 to 1960; and of Stoke Bishop until his Archdeacon’s appointment.

References

1909 births
Alumni of Downing College, Cambridge
Archdeacons of Bristol
1996 deaths